Boerne-Samuel V. Champion High School (CHS) is a 5A senior high school in Boerne, Texas. One of two high schools in Boerne, it is a part of the Boerne Independent School District.

The school opened in 2008 after splitting from Boerne High School and has about 2,000 students in 4 grades. It serves students from Boerne Middle School South and Mark T. Voss Middle School.

History 
Champion first opened for the 2008-2009 school year. The school is named after Samuel V. Champion (1954 - 2007), who was a longtime Boerne resident and principal of Boerne High School for many years. He also taught and coached at BHS, and was a member of Boerne High School's graduating class of 1972.

In 2017, the school was expanded to accommodate its growing student body.

In 2019, Champion began accepting students from Mark T. Voss Middle School, changing the number of middle schools feeding into it to 2.

In 2020, publication began of the school's newspaper, Charger Ink, and American Sign Language was added to the languages department.

In 2022, a water polo team was added to the athletics program.

Electives 
Electives offered at Champion include:

English, Media and Journalism 
CHS's yearbook, The Charger, is in its 15th year of publication. Its student-run school newspaper, Charger Ink., is in its 3rd year and is exclusively online. There are also journalism, photojournalism, A/V, animation, debate, and creative writing classes available.

Agriculture 
Many of Champion's students come from rural areas or upbringings, so the agriculture program is large and hosted in its own building on campus known as "The Ranch." The Ranch houses Principles of Agriculture, Small Animal Management, Equine Science, Practicum in Agriculture, and some of the technical education courses.

Career and Technical Education 
Many classes are career-based, with some allowing students to graduate high school with an associates degree in that field. These career-based classes include: architecture & interior design, business, computer science, culinary arts, education, engineering, human services, and STEM. Seniors in the courses take a 'practicum' where they intern at a local business or organization in their field during the school day. There is also an entrepreneur incubator program where students plan, develop, and launch a business over the course of a school year, as well as compete for mentorships and sponsorships for their business.

Health Science 
The health science pathway involves the human body and medicine through courses such as Principles of Health Science, Medical Terminology, Anatomy & Physiology, Health Science Theory, and Forensic Science. Seniors in the pathway do a practicum where they intern at a local medical facility of their choosing. There is also a branch of Health Occupation Students of America (HOSA) at Champion.

Fine Arts

Music 
There are a men's choir, women's choir, combined choir, orchestra, jazz band, and marching band, as well as music theory courses.

Theater 
In 2022, CHS's theater program won the State UIL One-Act Play competition. The performance season includes a summer comedy, fall drama, spring musical, and UIL one-act. There are also student-directed and written shows throughout the school year, and performances often involve the school's band and orchestra for live music and the dance team for ensemble work. Classes are available in theater, technical theater, and production.

Dance 
The dance team, called the Champion Charms, has a junior varsity and a varsity. It is one of the largest dance teams in the area and regularly performs at football games as well as competes and performs throughout the year. There is also a color guard team that performs with the marching band in the fall and competes independently in the spring.

Art 
The art program has art, drawing, painting, and sculpting classes. Art shows are done a few times a year and student art is regularly displayed throughout the school.

Language 
The Languages Other Than English (LOTE) department has three languages: Spanish, German, and American Sign Language. The Spanish program offers AP Spanish Language and AP Spanish Literature.

Sports 
As of the 2022-2023 school year, Champion HS offers 13 sports:

Men's 
 Baseball (Varsity and Junior Varsity teams)
 Basketball (Varsity and Junior Varsity teams)
 Football (Varsity, Junior Varsity and Freshmen teams)
 Soccer (Varsity and Junior Varsity teams)

Women's 
 Basketball (Varsity and Junior Varsity teams)
 Cheer (Varsity and Junior Varsity teams)
 Soccer (Varsity and Junior Varsity teams)
 Softball (Varsity and Junior Varsity teams)
 Volleyball (Varsity and Junior Varsity teams)

Combined 
 Cross Country
 Golf
 Swim & Dive
 Tennis (Varsity and Junior Varsity teams)
 Track & Field
 Water Polo

Academics 
To graduate, a student at CHS must have a health credit, a fine arts credit, a P.E. credit, two years of a language, four years of science, four years of math, four years of social studies, and four years of English.

Champion is a member of the Advanced Placement (AP) program, and offers many courses for college credit through it. There are also dual-credit programs available through Northwest Vista College and Angelo State University.

References

External links
 
 School parking map
School newspaper

Schools in Kendall County, Texas
Public high schools in Texas
2008 establishments in Texas
Educational institutions established in 2008